Endromarmata are a genus of moths, belonging to the family Tineidae. It contains only one species, Endromarmata lutipalpis, which is found in Mali and Senegal.

References

Myrmecozelinae
Monotypic moth genera
Moths of Africa
Lepidoptera of West Africa